Oneida is a city in Knox County, Illinois, United States. The population was 700 at the 2010 census, down from 750 in 2000. It is part of the Galesburg Micropolitan Statistical Area.

Geography

Demographics

As of the census of 2000, there were 752 people, 303 households, and 226 families residing in the city. The racial makeup of the city was 98.27% White, 0.00% African American, 0.13% Native American, 0.66% Asian, 0.00% Pacific Islander, 0.66% from other races, and 0.27% from two or more races. 1.33% of the population were Hispanic or Latino of any race.

There were 303 households, out of which 32.3% had children under the age of 18 living with them, 61.4% were married couples living together, 9.6% had a female householder with no husband present, and 25.4% were non-families. 24.1% of all households were made up of individuals, and 11.9% had someone living alone who was 65 years of age or older. The average household size was 2.48 and the average family size was 2.91.

In the city, the population was spread out, with 24.1% under the age of 18, 9.2% from 18 to 24, 24.6% from 25 to 44, 25.1% from 45 to 64, and 17.0% who were 65 years of age or older. The median age was 39 years. For every 100 females, there were 96.9 males. For every 100 females age 18 and over, there were 89.1 males.

The median income for a household in the city was $39,712, and the median income for a family was $46,250. Males had a median income of $31,974 versus $17,969 for females. The per capita income for the city was $16,991. 5.3% of the population and 4.8% of families were below the poverty line. Out of the total population, 10.5% of those under the age of 18 and 2.2% of those 65 and older were living below the poverty line.

Notable people 

 A. T. McMaster, Illinois legislator and farmer, was born in Oneida.
 Kid Mohler, second baseman for the Washington Senators, was born in Oneida.
Donald L. Moffitt, member of the Illinois House of Representatives, served as mayor of Oneida from 1972 to 1975.

References

Cities in Knox County, Illinois
Cities in Illinois
Galesburg, Illinois micropolitan area
Populated places established in 1854
1854 establishments in Illinois